Andrew Jerod Hoxie (born October 8, 1986) is an American soccer player for Utica City FC in the Major Arena Soccer League.

Career

College and amateur
Hoxie grew up in Newport News, Virginia, and attended Denbigh Baptist Christian School, where he won a state championship with the Minutemen. The team was coached by his father, Hal Hoxie. He played four years of college soccer at The College of William & Mary from 2005 to 2009 (redshirting in 2008), garnishing the CAA Player of the Year Award in his senior season, as well as earning third team All-American honors in 2009, and finishing his career with the Tribe with 91 points on 35 goals and 21 assists.

During his college years Hoxie also played for Virginia Legacy in the USL Premier Development League, scoring 20 goals in 42 appearances in his 4 campaigns with the club.

Professional
Hoxie was drafted in the third round (37th overall) of the 2010 MLS SuperDraft by San Jose Earthquakes, having impressed professional scouts at the 2010 MLS Combine by scoring two goals and adding an assist in three games, but was not offered a contract with the MLS team.

Hoxie signed with USSF Division 2 club Rochester Rhinos on March 30, 2010, and made his professional debut on April 10, 2010, in Rochester's season opening game against Miami FC. He scored hs first professional goal on April 25, 2010, in a game against the Austin Aztex. Rochester re-signed Hoxie for the 2012 season on October 25, 2011.

In November 2021, Hoxie signed with Florida Tropics SC.

On February 2, 2022, the Tropics conducted a trade with Utica City FC that saw Hoxie and Lucio Gonzaga move to Utica in exchange for Ricardo Diegues and Alencar Ventura Junior.

Honors

Rochester Rhinos
USSF Division 2 Pro League Regular Season Champions (1): 2010

Balitmore Blast
Major Arena Soccer League Ron Newman Cup (3): 2015, 2016, 2017

References

External links
 William & Mary bio
http://www.goal.com/en-us/news/55/main/2010/01/12/1739974/mls-combine-notebook-solid-on-day-two
https://web.archive.org/web/20100804094259/http://tribeathletics.com/story.php/7439/
http://www.goal.com/en-us/news/1110/major-league-soccer/2010/01/10/1736090/mls-combine-notebook-drenched-on-day-one
https://web.archive.org/web/20100803223600/http://tribeathletics.com/story.php/9543/
https://web.archive.org/web/20100803223553/http://tribeathletics.com/story.php/9672/

1986 births
Living people
American soccer players
Legacy 76 players
San Jose Earthquakes draft picks
Rochester New York FC players
Penn FC players
Orange County SC players
Soccer players from Oklahoma
William & Mary Tribe men's soccer players
Sportspeople from Enid, Oklahoma
Sportspeople from Newport News, Virginia
USL League Two players
USSF Division 2 Professional League players
USL Second Division players
USL Championship players
Major Arena Soccer League players
Soccer players from Virginia
Baltimore Blast players
Association football forwards
Florida Tropics SC players
Utica City FC players